Carole R. Fontaine (born 1950) is an internationally recognized American biblical scholar. She is the John Taylor professor of biblical theology and history at the Andover Newton Theological School and feminist author of six books and over 100 articles, in addition to serving on several editorial boards (including the Journal of Biblical Literature, the Catholic Biblical Quarterly, and the World Book Encyclopedia). She has written extensively on feminist theological topics, including disability, and is an expert in wisdom traditions and women in the ancient Near East.

Fontaine works on women's rights through NGOs designed to study the impact of religion on women's lives, particularly in a Muslim context.

A collection of her poetry, Only When Women Sing: Poems on Human Rights was published in 2009.

Select bibliography
 Traditional Sayings in the Old Testament, Almond Press, 1982, 
 A Heifer from Thy Stable: On Goddesses and the Status of Women in the Ancient Near East, reprinted in Women in the Hebrew Bible: A Reader, ed. Alice Bach (New York: Routledge, 1999), pp. 159–78
 Wisdom and Psalms: A Feminist Companion to the Bible, Sheffield Academic Press, 1999, 
 A Feminist Companion to Reading the Bible: Approaches, Methods, and Strategies, Sheffield Academic Press, 1997, 
 Smooth Words: Women, Proverbs And Performance In Biblical Wisdom, Sheffield Academic Press, 2004, 
 With Eyes of Flesh: The Bible, Gender and Human Rights (Bible in the Modern World)''', Sheffield Phoenix Press, 2008,  
 "Golden Do’s and Don’ts: Leviticus 19:1-17 from a Human-Rights-Based Approach (HRBA)," in Leviticus and Numbers: Text@Contexts Series, edited by Athalya Brenner and Archie Chi-Chung Lee, Fortress Press, 2013.

Media appearances
 Biography – "Satan: Prince of Darkness"
 Moses (Film Roos Emmy nomination)
 Solomon and Sheba Mysteries of the Bible'' – "JOB - The Devil's Test"

"She has numerous media credits (BBC; C-Span; Discovery Channel; National Geographic, and Arts & Entertainment Networks)" and Persian Satellite Network (broadcasts into Iran and Iraq).

References

External links
 Faculty profile at Andover Newton Theological School

Living people
Feminist biblical scholars
American biblical scholars
Andover Newton Theological School faculty
Old Testament scholars
1950 births
Female biblical scholars